Gator is a slang word for alligator.

Gator may also refer to:

People nicknamed Gator
Mike Greenwell (born 1963), American Major League Baseball player nicknamed "The Gator"
Ron Guidry (born 1950), former Major League Baseball pitcher
Gator Hoskins (born 1991), American former football player
Willis Jackson (saxophonist) (1932-1987), American jazz saxophonist
Mark Rogowski (born 1966), professional skateboarder convicted for a 1991 murder

Arts, entertainment, and media

Fictional characters
Gator, a recurring character in Thomas & Friends
Gabby Gator, an animated cartoon character, foe of Woody Woodpecker
Wally Gator, the titular character of "Wally Gator", one of the segments from The Hanna-Barbera New Cartoon Series

Other uses in arts, entertainment, and media
Gator (film), a 1976 action movie starring and directed by Burt Reynolds
Gator (game), a swimming pool game
"Gator", an instrumental track on the 1989 single "Homely Girl" by UB40
KNGT, a radio station branded "Gator 99.5", licensed to Lake Charles, Louisiana

Military
AN/TPS-80 Ground/Air Task Oriented Radar (G/ATOR), a radar system in development by the United States Marine Corps
Amphibious warfare ships, popularly known as "gators" or "gator freighters"
Boeing T-43, informally known as the Gator, modified Boeing 737 airplanes used for training navigators
GATOR mine system,  an American system of air-dropped anti-tank and anti-personnel mines developed in the 1980s

Sports
Gator, a defensive technique in volleyball popularized by Danny Kinda - see Volleyball jargon
Gators, the athletics teams of St. Amant High School, Ascension Parish, Louisiana
Gators, the athletics teams of Stone Ridge School of the Sacred Heart, a private school in Bethesda, Maryland
Gators, the athletics teams of Chapin School, an all-girls day school in Manhattan, New York
Gators, the athletics teams of Donald A Wilson Secondary School, Whitby, Ontario, Canada
Gators, the athletics teams of Lakeshore Catholic High School, Port Colborne, Ontario
Gators, the athletics teams of Crystal Lake South High School, Illinois
Florida Gators, the University of Florida's athletic teams
San Francisco State Gators, the athletics teams of San Francisco State University
Wuhan Gators, a professional arena football team based in Wuhan, China

Other uses
Claria Corporation, formerly Gator Corporation, an Internet advertising company
Gator or Gator AdServ, a piece of adware or spyware
John Deere Gator, a small utility vehicle

See also
 Croc (disambiguation)
 Gater (disambiguation)

Lists of people by nickname